Rob Thompson is an American television director, producer and screenwriter.

As a director, some his credits include L.A. Law, The Wonder Years, Doogie Howser, M.D., Dream On, Ed, The Chris Isaak Show, Monk and Northern Exposure. He won a Primetime Emmy Award for his work in the latter series as a part of the producing and writing team in 1992.

References

External links

American male screenwriters
American television directors
American television producers
Primetime Emmy Award winners
Living people
Place of birth missing (living people)
Year of birth missing (living people)
Directors Guild of America Award winners